Yi Teng (born 22 February 1990) is a Chinese footballer who currently plays for Guangzhou R&F in the Chinese Super League.

Club career
Yi Teng started his football career by signing with Chongqing Lifan's youth academy in 2003. After two years playing for Chongqing's youth academy, Yi joined Chengdu Blades's youth system in 2005 for further development. On 23 October 2009, he officially transferred to Ligue 2 side FC Metz after a brief and successful trial period. He became the second Chinese footballer to be signed a French side after Li Jinyu who played for AS Nancy in 1998. Yi was promoted to the first team squad in the 2010-11 season, but failed to make an impact and did not play at all for the entire season.

In July 2011, Yi signed a contract with Chinese Super League side Shenzhen Ruby. On 21 August 2011, he made his debut for the club in a 4–2 win against Dalian Shide, coming on as a substitute for Liu Chao in the 82nd minute. Yi was named as club captain by then manager Philippe Troussier in 2012 after Shenzhen was relegated to the second tier.

On 1 January 2013, along with Zhao Peng and Zeng Cheng, Yi transferred to Chinese Super League giant Guangzhou Evergrande for a fee of ¥10 million. On 10 July 2013, he made his debut for Guangzhou Evergrande in the fourth round of 2013 Chinese FA Cup in which Guangzhou beat Dalian Ruilong 7–1. He then made his league debut for Guangzhou on 25 August 2013, as a substitute for Elkeson in the final minutes of a league game against Guangzhou R&F.

On 10 February 2014, Yi moved to fellow top tier club Liaoning Whowin on a one-year loan deal. He made his debut for the club in a 1–1 draw against Shanghai East Asia on 9 March 2014. On 18 June 2015, he was loaned out again to another top tier side Hangzhou Greentown, rejoining former manager Philippe Troussier. He made his debut for Hangzhou on 28 June 2015 in a 2–0 loss against Guangzhou R&F. In January 2016, he was loaned to China League One club Beijing Renhe. On 12 February 2016, Yi was sold to Guangzhou R&F as part of Liu Dianzuo's transfer deal. He would join Guangzhou R&F in 2017 after his return from Beijing Renhe. He made his debut for Beijing on 13 March 2016, in a 0–0 away draw against Hunan Billows.

Guangzhou R&F officially announced Yi's transfer on 29 December 2016. He signed a three-year contract with the club. He made his debut for the club on 4 March 2017 in a 2–0 home win against Tianjin Quanjian. On 10 September 2017, he scored his first senior goal in a 2–1 away defeat to Hebei China Fortune. He scored another goal of the season on 4 November 2017 in a 2–0 home win over Chongqing Dangdai Lifan.

Yi was promoted as the team captain in the 2018 season after Jiang Zhipeng's transfer. He extended his contract again until the end of 2022 season on 25 April 2018.

Career statistics
.

Honours

Club
Guangzhou Evergrande
Chinese Super League: 2013
AFC Champions League: 2013

References

External links
FC Metz profile 
 

1990 births
Living people
Association football midfielders
Chinese footballers
Footballers from Guizhou
Expatriate footballers in France
Chinese expatriate footballers
FC Metz players
Shenzhen F.C. players
Guangzhou F.C. players
Liaoning F.C. players
Zhejiang Professional F.C. players
Beijing Renhe F.C. players
Guangzhou City F.C. players
Chinese Super League players
China League One players
People from Guiyang